2015 Gayo Daejun Limited Edition it is an extended play recorded by various artists to major annual end-of-the-year music program Gayo Daejun broadcast by Seoul Broadcasting System (SBS).

Track listing

References

2015 EPs
Korean-language EPs